Eastern Television Network (ETN Somali TV) is a Somali private television channel.

Overview
ETN was founded in 2005. Along with the Somali Broadcasting Corporation, it is one of two stations and with headquarters in Bosaso, the commercial capital of the northeastern Puntland region of Somalia.

The channel also has a branch in Garowe.

Programs
Eastern Television Network airs programs six hours per day.

Its broadcast schedule includes news, cultural, music and sports programming, as well as advertisements.

Management
The media entity is led bh exprienced managment .

It has a staff of 10 employees.

See also
Media of Somalia
Somali National Television
Horn Cable Television
Somaliland National TV
Shabelle Media Network
Universal Television (Somalia)

References

Television channels in Somalia
Television channels and stations established in 2005